Alfred Mayart Cooper Jr. (November 1, 1899 – March 19, 1966), nicknamed "Army", was an American Negro league pitcher between 1928 and 1932.

A native of Kansas City, Kansas, Cooper made his Negro leagues debut in 1928 with the Kansas City Monarchs. He played three seasons with Kansas City, and finished his career in 1932 with the Cleveland Stars. Cooper died in Kansas City in 1966 at age 66.

References

External links
 and Seamheads

1899 births
1966 deaths
Kansas City Monarchs players
20th-century African-American sportspeople
Baseball pitchers